Te Haumi is a settlement south-east of Paihia and north-west of Opua in the Bay of Islands area of Northland Region, New Zealand.

The Rangatira (Chief) Tohitapu lived at Te Haumi until his death in 1833. He is remembered in the naming of Tohitapu Road.

Demographics
Te Haumi is in two SA1 statistical areas which cover . The SA1 areas are part of the larger Opua statistical area.

Te Haumi had a population of 375 at the 2018 New Zealand census, an increase of 15 people (4.2%) since the 2013 census, and a decrease of 15 people (−3.8%) since the 2006 census. There were 180 households, comprising 174 males and 204 females, giving a sex ratio of 0.85 males per female, with 36 people (9.6%) aged under 15 years, 27 (7.2%) aged 15 to 29, 186 (49.6%) aged 30 to 64, and 129 (34.4%) aged 65 or older.

Ethnicities were 84.8% European/Pākehā, 17.6% Māori, 3.2% Pacific peoples, 2.4% Asian, and 0.8% other ethnicities. People may identify with more than one ethnicity.

Although some people chose not to answer the census's question about religious affiliation, 47.2% had no religion, 43.2% were Christian, 0.8% were Buddhist and 2.4% had other religions.

Of those at least 15 years old, 75 (22.1%) people had a bachelor's or higher degree, and 42 (12.4%) people had no formal qualifications. 33 people (9.7%) earned over $70,000 compared to 17.2% nationally. The employment status of those at least 15 was that 144 (42.5%) people were employed full-time, 45 (13.3%) were part-time, and 6 (1.8%) were unemployed.

References

Far North District
Populated places in the Northland Region
Bay of Islands